Aleksander Jõeäär (31 October 1890 in Laimjala, Kreis Ösel – 20 May 1959 in Tallinn) was an Estonian politician and lawyer. He was a member of the I, II, III, IV and V Riigikogu.

He was also member of Soviet Estonia's Johannes Vares' cabinet. He was appointed as Minister of Agricultural Affairs.

References

1890 births
1959 deaths
People from Saaremaa Parish
People from Kreis Ösel
Estonian Social Democratic Workers' Party politicians
Estonian Socialist Workers' Party politicians
Communist Party of Estonia politicians
Government ministers of Estonia
People's commissars and ministers of the Estonian Soviet Socialist Republic
Members of the Riigikogu, 1920–1923
Members of the Riigikogu, 1923–1926
Members of the Riigikogu, 1926–1929
Members of the Riigikogu, 1929–1932
Members of the Riigikogu, 1932–1934
Members of the Riigivolikogu
Members of the Supreme Soviet of the Estonian Soviet Socialist Republic, 1940–1947
Members of the Supreme Soviet of the Estonian Soviet Socialist Republic, 1947–1951
20th-century Estonian lawyers
Prisoners and detainees of the Soviet Union
Soviet rehabilitations